St Helen's Bishopsgate is an Anglican church in London. It is located in Great St Helen's, off Bishopsgate.

It is the largest surviving parish church in the City of London. Several notable figures are buried there, and it contains more monuments than any other church in Greater London except Westminster Abbey, hence it is sometimes referred to as the "Westminster Abbey of the City". It was the parish church of William Shakespeare when he lived in the area in the 1590s.  It was one of only a few churches in the City of London to survive both the Great Fire of 1666 and the Blitz.

Owing to parish consolidation over the years, the parish is now named "St Helen's Bishopsgate with St Andrew Undershaft and St Ethelburga Bishopsgate and St Martin Outwich and St Mary Axe". The Worshipful Company of Merchant Taylors are the patrons of the benefice.

Today, it is home to a large congregation in the conservative evangelical tradition with a ministry to city workers, families, students and young professionals. Four English-speaking (and one Mandarin-speaking) church services take place each Sunday, as well as a number of midweek talks and small group Bible studies.

The nearby churches St Andrew Undershaft and St Peter upon Cornhill are also administered by St Helen's.

History
Although it is thought that a Roman or a Saxon building might have stood on the site, the first mentions of the parish church of St Helen date back to the mid-12th century. In 1210, the Dean and chapter of St. Paul's gave William, son of William Goldsmith, permission to establish a priory of Benedictine nuns; and a nunnery was built alongside the existing church. The new church was  wider than the parish church, and longer too, so the parish church was lengthened to match. The masonry of the outer walls as it currently stands was in place by 1300. The church was divided in two by a partition running from east to west, the northern half serving the nuns and the southern the parishioners. In 1480, four great arches were installed between the nun's choir and the parishioner's nave, and a wooden screen was put in place to separate the two. An additional screen was placed in the parish church to separate the chancel in the east end of the church, where the altar was located, from the nave.

A crypt extended north from the church under the hall. Next to the church, the priory had extensive monastic buildings; they were later acquired and used by the Worshipful Company of Leathersellers until their demolition in 1799. The church is the only surviving building from a nunnery in the City of London.

When the priory was dissolved in 1538, the nunnery was incorporated in the parish church and the screen separating it from the rest of the church was removed. This gave the church its unusual construction consisting of two naves. In the following years, the building was rearranged according the principles of the Reformation, which put the emphasis on the preaching of the Word and on the full and active participation of the congregation. A Jacobean pulpit was erected in 1615 in a central position on the south wall, accompanied by an ornamental tester in 1640. Box pews were installed and arranged around the pulpit.

In the 17th century, extensive repairs were carried out, most notably resulting in the addition of two Classical wooden doorcases. By the end of the century, a bell turret was also erected.  St Helen's was one of only a few City of London churches to survive the Great Fire of London of 1666.

A new organ and organ loft were installed on the west end of the church in 1742, designed by Thomas Griffin. In 1874 the parish was united with that of St Martin Outwich when the latter's church was demolished, and the first incumbent of the new parish was John Bathurst Deane.

During the Victorian era, two significant restorations were carried out. The first, in 1865, provided the two stone tracery windows on the east end of the church and stained glass throughout the building. The second, more significant, Victorian restoration was carried out from 1891 to 1893 by John Loughborough Pearson under supervision of the then rector, John Alfred Lumb Airey. This restoration was inspired by the Oxford movement, which advocated moving the centre of importance in the church from preaching to the sacrament of the Eucharist. This new arrangement resulted in a new floor with levels gradually ascending from the west to a new high altar in the east, completed by an ornated reredos and marble pavement, once again enclosed in a chancel by a neo-Gothic screen. The organ was expanded and moved to the south transept, where two additional altars were also placed in two side chapels, the Chapel of the Holy Ghost and the Chapel of our Lady. The church was reopened on St John the Baptist's Day in 1893 by the Bishop of London, Frederick Temple.

As the church had been used as a burial ground for centuries, it is thought that over a 1000 bodies had been interred in vaults under the floor by this period. The excavation of the floor at the start of the 1891 restoration caused some of the burials to emerge from the vaults: all work had to stop for one year until all human remains were translated to Ilford Cemetery, and a  concrete slab was put in place between the floor and the remains of the vault.

The church was left undamaged by the Blitz during World War II and it was designated a Grade I-listed building on 4 January 1950.

When Dick Lucas became rector in 1961, St Helen's grew from a small congregation of a few individuals to a large thriving church within the conservative evangelical tradition of the Church of England, with a reputation for strong Bible teaching and preaching. As the City of London had grown to become a major business and Financial centre, the church started providing an active midweek ministry to City workers. Next to the lunchtime midweek talks for workers, the three Sunday services are now attended by a diverse range of people including students, young workers, families and internationals.

In 1992 and 1993, the church was badly damaged by two IRA bombs that were set off nearby. A full restoration was carried out by architect Quinlan Terry, an enthusiast of Georgian architecture, and designed along Reformation lines. The floor was evened out and returned to its original level, which allowed for the installation of underfloor heating, a sound reinforcement system and a baptistry in front of the pulpit. A new gallery was erected on the west end to provide additional seating and house the organ, now returned to its original position. All the windows were glazed in clear glass. The Victorian screen was rotated by 90 degrees across the south transept, opening up the former chancel. A new door was opened in the south transept. All altars were removed, giving space to a restored Georgian communion table.

The principles of this restoration sought to arrange the building once again around the preaching of the Word and strip it down of the ritualistic elements added in Victorian times, following the needs of the large Evangelical congregation. This new arrangement allowed the seating capacity to be increased from 500 to a 1000, all in a large open space with a clear view on the pulpit and lectern.

Activities 
The church holds three English-speaking services each Sunday, one at 10:30 am, another at 4:00 pm, and a 6:00 pm evening service; a Mandarin-speaking service takes place each Sunday at 2:00 pm. The Sunday afternoon and evening services are followed by an informal meal and opportunities to socialise. A 10:00 am service takes place in the nearby St Peter upon Cornhill, while still being part of the wider St Helen's congregation.

A number of lunchtime talks and meetings take place during the working week, providing an opportunity for people who work in the City of London to hear the Christian message and be encouraged to live as Christians at works.

There are also numerous small groups which meet at the church during the week. These include the "Read, Mark, Learn" (RML) groups which either study the Gospel of Mark, the Gospel of John, the Epistle to the Romans or a Bible overview over the course of a year, and the Central Focus group which studies a whole variety of topics and books from the Bible. The church also runs the Christianity Explored course regularly.

Some activities take place in the nearby church of St Peter upon Cornhill and the church of St Andrew Undershaft, which are also administered by St Helen's.

Building
The present building is the result of a substantial restoration in 1993-1995 by architect Quinlan Terry, after consistent damages were incurred by two IRA bombs in 1992 and 1993.

The restoration resulted in a bright, large, flexible open-space interior that can be used in different configurations. It is equipped with modern lighting, underfloor heating, and public address system. Although some of the monuments were lost due to the bombings, the majority of them survived and were preserved in the building.

Memorials
 North wall of the nuns' choir, near the west end, Alderman John Robinson, 1599. An Elizabethan group of kneeling figures; the deceased and his wife with nine sons and seven daughters.
 In the north-east corner, at the east end of the nuns' choir, altar tomb of Sir Thomas Gresham, 1579. Founder of the Royal Exchange and the Gresham Lectures. Before 1995, this space was known as the Gresham Memorial Chapel
 In the south transept, Sir Julius Caesar Adelmare, 1636. Judge of the Court of Admiralty. Altar tomb with Latin epitaph in the form of a deed to which is affixed the broad seal of the deceased. Before 1995, this was located side by side the Gresham memorial.
 In the south-east corner of the Gresham Memorial Chapel, Sir Andrew Judd 1558. Lord Mayor, citizen and skinner. Founder of Tonbridge School.
 Under the chancel arch, north of where the high altar once stood, Sir William Pickering, 1574. Ambassador in the reign of Queen Elizabeth I. Altar tomb with recumbent figure surmounted by a lofty canopy.
 Under the chancel arch, south where the high altar once stood, Sir John Crosby 1476 founder of Crosby Hall, and Agnes his wife. Altar tomb with recumbent figures.
 In the south transept, Sir John Oteswich and his wife. Formerly in the church of St Martin Outwich.
 Against the south wall of the church, sightly to the west of the south entrance, Sir John Spencer and his wife, 1609. Altar tomb under a canopy with recumbent figures, and a third kneeling figure.

Organ

The organ dates from 1742 when an annuity organ by Thomas Griffin was installed. It has undergone several restorations since by builders such as George Pike England in 1810, J. C. Bishop and Son in 1910 and 1923, Hill, Norman and Beard in 1929 and 1957 and Martin Goetze & Dominic Gwynn in 1996. A specification of the organ can be found on the National Pipe Organ Register.

The organ is of historic significance and has been awarded a Grade II* listing by the British Institute of Organ Studies.

Organists
Thomas Griffin 1744–1771
George Griffin 1771–1809
William Henry Cutler 1809–1819
George Warne 1819–1820
Joseph Nightingale 1820–1842/7?
William Richard Bexfield 1848–1853
Mr Deane 1854
Miss A. Barton 1867
Richard Simpkin 1995–present

Burials 
John Crosby (died 1476)
Robert Knollys (courtier)
William Holles
Richard Williams (alias Cromwell)
Andrew Judde
Thomas Gresham
Sir Alberico Gentili
Robert Hooke

Notable ministers

Rectors 

 1541 John Weste
 1571 Thomas
 1575 John Olivar
 1586 ? Lewis
 1592 Nicholas Felton
 1600 Lewis Hughes
 1603 Richard Ball, S.T.B.
 1613 Thomas Downing
 1618 Thomas Evans
 1619 William Laurence
 1621 Joseph Browne, A.M.
 1635 Richard Maden, S.T.B.
 1639 Matthias Milward
 1642 Thomas Edwards
 1645 Samuel Willis
 1647 Arthur Barham
 1663 John Sybbald, A.M
 1666 Thomas Horton, S.T.P.
 1674 Edward Pelling, A.M
 1678 Henry Hesketh, A.M. (nominated Bishop of Killala, 1689).
 1695 Thomas Willis, A.M
 1701 Samson Estwicke. S.T.B
 1713 William Butler, LL.B. (Prebendary of St. Pauls).
 1773 John Naish
 1795 Robert Watts, M.A.
 1799 James Blenkarne, M.A.
 1835 Charles Mackenzie, M.A.
 1847 John Thomas How Le Mesurier, M.A. (Archdeacon of Gibraltar).
 1849 John Edmund Cox, D.D.
 1873–1887: John Bathurst Deane
 1887–1909: John Alfred Lumb Airey
 1909 Silvanus Taylor Hingston Saunders, M.A.
 1951–1953: Ronald Goodchild
 1953–1961: John Miller
 1961–1998: Dick Lucas
 1998–present: William Taylor

Curates 

 1954-1958: Gordon Jones
 1958-1960: Peter Coleman
 1961-1967: David Macinnes
 1970-1973: Ian Barclay
 1973-1978: Robert Howarth
 1976-1981: Jonathan Fletcher
 1977-1978: Thomas Oates
 1978-1982: James Spence
 1982-1984: Simon Manchester
 1985-1995: Hugh Palmer
 1990-1995: Justin Mote
 1994-1996: Carrie Sandom
 1994-1998: Richard Coombs
 1995-1998: William Taylor, now Rector
 1995-1998: Jonathan Juckes
 1998-2007: Nigel Beynon
 2000-2005: Simon Dowdy
 2002-2005: James de Costobadie
 2003–present: Charlie Skrine
 2003-2007: Ben Cooper
 2004-2011: Mark O'Donoghue
 2004-2009: Lee Gatiss, now director of the Church Society
 2005–present: Matt Fuller
 2007-2017: Andrew Sach
 2007-2012: Chris Fishlock
 2007-2013: Paul Clarke
 2007-2010: Andrew Towner
 2009–present: Aneirin Glyn
 2009-2014: Thomas Nash
 2010-2017: Jamie Child
 2016–present: Mickey Mantle

Church plants
St Helen's has been involved in numerous church planting initiatives, some within the auspices of the Church of England, some outside of it.

See also

 List of buildings that survived the Great Fire of London
List of English abbeys, priories and friaries serving as parish churches

Notes

References

External links

Official website
Talk by architect Quinlan Terry about the history of the building and its most recent restoration
St Helen's iOS app
St Helen's Android app

13th-century church buildings in England
Church of England church buildings in the City of London
Evangelicalism in the Church of England
Diocese of London
Grade I listed churches in the City of London
Pre–Great Fire churches in the City of London
Monasteries dissolved under the English Reformation